The First Internet Backgammon Server (FIBS) began operating on July 19, 1992, allowing users to play backgammon in real-time against other people. It was hosted on the Internet, and could track player performance using a modified version of the Elo rating system.

It was created by Andreas "Marvin" Schneider in 1992. It has been maintained since 1996 by Patti Beadles. Anyone with access to the Internet can create a username and play for free. FIBS caters to a strong international community of backgammon players. It was an immediate success, and no other backgammon server came online until 1997.

Game play
Early users connected to FIBS via a command line interface through TELNET similar to a MUD, with the standard backgammon board drawn in ASCII text. Dice rolls are represented numerically and moves are performed by entering starting and ending point numbers, similar to standard backgammon notation. Other game related commands are available by typing the appropriate command. The first graphical user interfaces for FIBS were developed in 1994; FIBS/W for Windows and MacFIBS for the classic Mac OS. Graphical interfaces continue to be developed for most major computing platforms, including mobile phones and tablets, however telnet remains the underlying protocol for FIBS. This allows anyone with access to the Internet to log into FIBS regardless of platform.

Bots have been developed, some based on neural net programs like gnubg, JellyFish, TD-Gammon, and Snowie, to allow human players to compete with these computer programs on FIBS and to analyze these programs' performance in real-world play. This is one way FIBS has served as an experimental platform for the advancement of computer science and continues to do so.

The server provided the first opportunity for backgammon players to be rated on the Elo rating system first devised for chess. The server has been used for testing artificial intelligence concepts using the backgammon bot LGammon, written by Mark Land of the University of California, San Diego.

Community
FIBS supports communication between players via text messages using the "shout" command which broadcasts to all players, in-game using the "kibitz" or "whisper" commands, and privately using the "tell" command. The "shout" command was initially implemented as a way for a player to find an opponent but has developed into a method of communicating with the general FIBS population. Users have a range of options to filter the amount of text messaging they receive, from ignoring troublesome users (with the "gag" command) to fully blocking receipt of all "shout" messages (using the "toggle silent" command).
FIBS has a thriving program of tournaments and leagues, run by Tourneybot, which is supplied and maintained by Tom Moulton.

See also

World Backgammon Federation

References

External links

Backgammon video games